James McMillan Chapman (born 26 July 1965) is a Scottish football player and coach who is currently in his second spell as manager of Kilmarnock FC Women. Chapman played for Albion Rovers and Dumbarton as a forward. He has previously managed Annan Athletic, Albion Rovers, Dumbarton and Clyde.

Player

Chapman played as a forward for Albion Rovers and Dumbarton. A knee injury ended his career aged 25.

Manager

Kilmarnock Ladies

Chapman began his managerial career with a successful stint at Kilmarnock Ladies between 2001 and 2004. He won two Scottish Women's Premier League championships, 1 Scottish Women's Cup, 2 Scottish Women's Premier League Cup and 1 Scottish Women's Football League First Division Cup.

Albion Rovers

Chapman moved into men's football with Albion Rovers, but he was sacked in May 2007 after a dispute with the board.

Dumbarton

Chapman was then appointed Dumbarton manager in December 2007. He led the Sons to the Scottish Third Division championship and promotion the following season. Chapman resigned as Dumbarton manager in October 2010, with the team struggling in the Second Division and took a football development role with the club.

Annan Athletic
He was appointed manager of Third Division club Annan Athletic in January 2013. Chapman won his first game on his eighth attempt with a shock 2–1 win over Rangers at Ibrox on Saturday 9 March 2013. Almost three years later in January 2016, he led the club to a Scottish Cup shock win over Scottish Premiership side Hamilton Academical with an emphatic 4–1 home win.

Clyde
On 20 May 2017, after over four years with Annan Athletic, Chapman left the club to manager fellow Scottish League Two side Clyde. Chapman left Clyde on 31 October 2017, with the club saying that "league results, performances and overall standards" had fallen short of their expectations.

Managerial statistics

 No statistics available for Kilmarnock Ladies or Albion Rovers.

Honours and achievements

 Kilmarnock Ladies
 Scottish Women's Premier League (2): 2001–02, 2002–03
 Scottish Women's Cup: 2001–02
 Scottish Women's Premier League Cup (2): 2002–03, 2003–04
 Scottish Women's Football League First Division Cup: 2001-02

 Dumbarton 
 Scottish Third Division: 2008–09 
 Stirlingshire Cup: 2009-10

References

1965 births
Albion Rovers F.C. managers
Albion Rovers F.C. players
Thorniewood United F.C. players
Annan Athletic F.C. managers
Association football forwards
Clyde F.C. managers
Dumbarton F.C. managers
Dumbarton F.C. players
Living people
Footballers from Coatbridge
Scottish Junior Football Association players
Scottish Football League players
Scottish Football League managers
Scottish football managers
Scottish footballers
Scottish Professional Football League managers